These are the results of 2017 BWF World Senior Championships 55+ events.

Men's singles

Seeds
 Per Juul (quarterfinals)
 Loke Poh Wong (semifinals, bronze medal)
 Bengt Mellquist (quarterfinals)
 Eric Plane (second round)

Finals

Top half

Section 1

Section 2

Bottom half

Section 3

Section 4

Women's singles

Seeds
 Heidi Bender (champion, gold medal)
 Kuniko Yamamoto (semifinals, bronze medal)

Group A

Group B

Group C

Group D

Finals

Men's doubles

Seeds
 Per Juul /  Bengt Mellquist (semifinals, bronze medal)
 Eric Plane / Roger Taylor (final, silver medal)
 Bovornovadep Devakula / Chongsak Suvanich (semifinals, bronze medal)
 Toshiyuki Kamiya / Noriaki Matsunari (quarterfinals)

Finals

Top half

Section 1

Section 2

Bottom half

Section 3

Section 4

Women's doubles

Seeds
 Birte Bach Steffensen /  Heidi Bender (champions, gold medal)
 Miyolo Sato / Kuniko Yamamoto (final, silver medal)

Group A

Group B

Group C

Group D

Finals

Mixed doubles

Seeds
 Bobby Ertanto /  Heidi Bender (champions, gold medal)
 Toshiyuki Kamiya / Kuniko Yamamoto (quarterfinals)
 Noriaki Matusnari / Miyoko Sato (semifinals, bronze medal)
 Bengt Mellquist /  Sue Sheen (semifinals, bronze medal)

Finals

Top half

Section 1

Section 2

Bottom half

Section 3

Section 4

References

Men's singles
Results

Women's singles
Group A Results
Group B Results
Group C Results
Group D Results
Finals Results

Men's doubles
Results

Women's doubles
Group A Results
Group B Results
Group C Results
Group D Results
Finals Results

Mixed doubles
Results

2017 BWF World Senior Championships